Alexandru Ionuț "Alex" Florea (born 15 September 1991) is a Romanian singer. Along with Ilinca Băcilă, he represented Romania in the Eurovision Song Contest 2017 with the song "Yodel It!" finishing in 7th place in the grand final. He previously competed in season four of X Factor and in season five of Vocea României.

Discography

Singles

Awards and nominations

References

Eurovision Song Contest entrants of 2017
Eurovision Song Contest entrants for Romania
Living people
1991 births
People from Constanța
Romanian male pop singers
The Voice (franchise) contestants
21st-century Romanian male singers
21st-century Romanian singers